Passy is an area in Paris, France.

Passy may also refer to:

Places 
 Passy Cemetery in Paris, France
 Passy (Paris Métro), a station on Line 6
 Communes in France:
 Passy, Haute-Savoie, in the Haute-Savoie département
 Passy, Saône-et-Loire, in the Saône-et-Loire département
 Passy, Yonne, in the Yonne département
 Passy-en-Valois, in the Aisne département
 Passy-Grigny, in the Marne département
 Passy-sur-Marne, in the Aisne département
 Passy-sur-Seine, in the Seine-et-Marne département
 Passy Peak in Antarctica

Other uses 
 Passy (surname)

See also 
 PASY, the ICAO code for Eareckson Air Station
 Pasi (disambiguation)
 Passi (disambiguation)